Acht may refer to:

Legal history
German-language term for outlawry
Imperial ban in the Holy Roman Empire

People
René Acht (1920 – 1998), Swiss painter and graphic artist

Places
Acht, Rhineland-Palatinate, Germany
Acht, village within the municipality of Eindhoven, Netherlands
Hohe Acht, a mountain peak in the Eifel range, Germany
African-Canadian Heritage Tour, a designated trail in Ontario, Canada

Other uses
Acht, German and Dutch for "eight"; see 8 (number)
Acht (TV channel), a Flemish television channel
 "Acht-acht", informal name for the German 8.8 cm Flak 18/36/37/41 gun